Trenette is a type of narrow, flat, dried pasta from Genoa, Liguria; it is similar to both linguine and fettuccine. Trenette is the plural of trenetta, but is only used in the plural and is probably a diminutive of the Genoese trena 'string'. Trenette is commonly served in the form of pasta served with pesto, a dish known as trenette al pesto, which can also include potatoes and green beans boiled in the same water.

See also
Cuisine of Liguria
Fettuccine
Linguine
List of pasta types

References

Types of pasta
Cuisine of Liguria